Bjørn Strøm (born 11 December 1982 in Svolvær, Lofoten) is a Norwegian former football striker,.

His former clubs are FK Lofoten, Tromsø IL, Tromsdalen UIL, Tromsø IL (second time), FK Haugesund and Tromsdalen UIL (second time). He played one game in the Norwegian Premier League, in July 2005, and played for Haugesund in the 2007 Norwegian Cup final.

Career statistics

References
FK Haugesund squad list
Tromsø IL profile
Profile at altomfotball.no

1982 births
Living people
People from Vågan
Norwegian footballers
Tromsø IL players
Tromsdalen UIL players
FK Haugesund players
Eliteserien players
Association football forwards
Sportspeople from Nordland